Vittorio Francesco of Savoy (Vittorio Francesco Filippo; 10 December 1694 – 20 March 1762) was the illegitimate son of Victor Amadeus II of Sardinia and Jeanne Baptiste d'Albert de Luynes. He was styled as the Marquis of Susa.

Biography

His mother, Madame de Verrue, was the French wife of prominent Piedmontese diplomat working for the Duke of Savoy. At the Savoyard capital of Turin, the Duke of Savoy became infatuated with the young countess and in 1689, Jeanne Baptiste gave into the duke's overture, encouraged by the Duchess of Savoy Anne Marie d'Orléans and her uncle, the French king Louis XIV.
 
When Victor Amadeus II became so obsessed with Jeanne Baptiste that he had her shut up from view of the court for some time, Jeanne Baptiste fled Savoy and sought refuge in France, ruled by Louis XIV. When Vittorio's mother fled Savoy in 1700, he and his sister Maria Vittoria Francesca of Savoy were left in Savoy and were cared for by a loving father.
Victor Amadeus II had them both legitimised and created them Marquis and Marchesa of Susa.

Vittorio had a military career and led the Piedmontese troops against a French-Spanish army in the Battle of Villafranca (1744), where he was taken prisoner. 

He married in 1760 with Maria Lucrezia Franchi (died 1777), daughter of Gaspare Orazio Franchi, Count of Ponte Chianale. They had no children.

Ancestry

References

1694 births
1762 deaths
Vittorio Francesco
17th-century Italian nobility
18th-century Italian military personnel
Vittorio Francesco
Nobility from Turin
Italian people of the War of the Austrian Succession
Sons of kings